Philippe II Ambroise Eugène Ghislain d'Olmen, 1st baron of Poederlé (7 December 1793 – 2 October 1815) was a soldier and politician of the Austrian Netherlands.

He was the son of Eugène II Joseph d'Olmen, Baron of Poederlee and Hypollite Françoise de Vicq, Lady of Kontich. His father was lord chamberlain at the imperial court. He married Louise Charlotte de Maret de Brouenne and had a son, Hypolitte Ernest d'Olmen, who was Baron of Poederlee after his father's death.

References
 Leconte Louis, Coup d'œil sur la Légion Belge de 1814, dans Carnet de la Fourragère, 9ème série, Bruxelles, Établissements d'imprimerie L'Avenir, 1950, pp. 301–321.
 Leconte Louis, La Grande Misère de la Légion Belge de 1814, dans Carnet de la Fourragère, 13e série, Bruxelles, Établissements d'imprimerie L'Avenir, 1960, pp. 366–404.

1773 births
1815 deaths
Belgian politicians
Austrian Empire military personnel of the French Revolutionary Wars
Austrian Empire people of the Napoleonic Wars
Military personnel of the Austrian Netherlands
Nobility of the Austrian Netherlands